The College of Engineering and Applied Science is a college within the University of Wisconsin–Milwaukee. It offers bachelor, master and doctoral degrees in civil engineering, electrical engineering, industrial engineering, materials engineering, mechanical engineering, and computer science.

Based on the statistical analysis by H.J. Newton, Professor of Statistics at Texas A&M University in 1997 on the National Research Council report issued in 1995, the school was  ranked 73rd nationally in the National Research Council (NRC) rankings, with its Civil Engineering program 69th, Electronic Engineering 96th, Industrial Engineering 34th, Materials science 60th,  and Mechanical Engineering 87th. The school ranks 129th nationally by U.S. News & World Report, with its computer science program ranked 110th in 2011.

Departments
Civil Engineering & Mechanics
Computer Science
Electrical Engineering
Industrial & Manufacturing Engineering
Materials Science
Mechanical Engineering

Research centers
Center for Alternative Fuels Research Programs
Center for By-Products Utilization
Center for Composite Materials
Center for Cryptography, Computer, & Network Security
Center for Ergonomics
Center for Urban Transportation Studies
Center for Energy Analysis & Diagnostics
Southeastern Wisconsin Energy Technology Research Center

Notable people
 Satya Nadella ('90 MS Computer Science), Microsoft CEO. 
 Michael Dhuey, electrical and computer engineer, co-inventor of the Macintosh II and the iPod.
 Luther Graef ('61 MS Structural Engineering), Founder of Graef Anhalt Schloemer & Associates Inc., and former President of ASCE.
 Phil Katz ('84, BS Computer Science), a computer programmer best known as the author of PKZIP.
 Pradeep Rohatgi, Wisconsin Distinguished Professor of Engineering
 Cheng Xu, aerodynamic design engineer, American Society of Mechanical Engineers Fellow
 Y. Austin Chang, material engineering researcher and educator
 Scott Yanoff ('93 BS Computer Science), Internet pioneer.
 Alan Kulwicki ('77 BS Mechanical Engineering), 1992 NASCAR Cup Series champion driver and team owner

See also
 Jantar-Mantar

References

External links
College of Engineering and Applied Science
University of Wisconsin–Milwaukee

University of Wisconsin–Milwaukee
Engineering schools and colleges in the United States
Engineering universities and colleges in Wisconsin